Ultra Beatdown is the fourth studio album by English power metal band DragonForce, released on 20 August 2008 in Japan through JVC and on 26 August 2008 worldwide through Roadrunner Records and Spinefarm Records. Ultra Beatdown is the last studio album to feature ZP Theart on vocals and the first one to feature Frédéric Leclercq on the bass guitar.

Overview
On 4 July 2008, the first single from the album, "Heroes of Our Time", was posted on their MySpace profile. On 8 July 2008, the music video for Heroes of Our Time was released onto their MySpace profile. The songs "Heartbreak Armageddon", "The Fire Still Burns" and "A Flame for Freedom" were all played on 106.1 Rock Radio during an interview with ZP Theart on 15 July 2008. On 14 August 2008, the album was made available for pre-order in the DragonForce official web store. On 18 August 2008 the album became available for streaming on the band's MySpace page.

The music video for "The Last Journey Home" premiered on the Xbox Live Network on 21 January 2009. Frédéric Leclercq announced that they may release a live DVD in 2009–2010. This did not happen however, though in September 2010 a live CD was released titled Twilight Dementia.

Ultra Beatdown is the final album featuring lead vocalist ZP Theart and the first album to earn the band a Grammy nomination.

Sound
Before the release of Ultra Beatdown, the band members were interviewed upon the topic of the album's structure and deliverance. Totman, Theart and Li all generally stated that the sound of Ultra Beatdown would not very much differ from their previous records but would improve in some categories.

Touring and support
The first round of DragonForce's Ultra Beatdown World tour started on 25 September 2008 in The Zodiac, Oxford with Turisas. The US/Canada tour also includes Powerglove. The band toured almost constantly up until April 2009 in several countries with support by Dååth and Cynic. They had planned to carry out their world tour to Latin America in May 2009, but delayed their arrival to November 2009 due to the swine flu epidemic as well as "exhaustion" according to what Herman Li stated in an interview.

The band had planned to release a live DVD in summer 2009 but instead released a series of videos entitled "DragonForce TV" which showed the band on tour as well as pro-shot footage of their performances at Graspop 2009 and Loudpark 2009. It also featured backstage footage of the band rehearsing and just hanging out. The rumoured DVD was never released due to lack of time when the band was touring. The DragonForce TV: Season 1 footage was uploaded during a break before the next-to-final leg of the tour in Latin America and North America. However, to make up for the false DVD, the band recorded the audio from every show on the final leg of the Ultra Beatdown World Tour to release the best cuts on a live compilation album. Herman Li stated in a 2010 interview regarding the album:

"The idea was to record every single show from the last leg of the tour, so we could pick the best take of each song without needing to do any overdubs in the studio; keeping the whole thing ‘LIVE’ like all the classic live metal albums.

"These recordings really capture the raw sonic energy of a Dragonforce show in fine detail. It is so real that you can hear the noise of the crowd and experience the show as it was that night – you can even hear the guitar pedals being stepped on!"

The album's official announcement was made on 22 June 2010. Titled Twilight Dementia, it was released in September 2010.

Critical reception

The song "Heroes of Our Time" was nominated for the Grammy Award for Best Metal Performance, losing to Metallica's "My Apocalypse". On 28 August 2008, the album charted at No. 9 in Japan it also entered the Australian charts in the first week of September at No. 19 and in the same week at No. 18 in both the UK Albums Chart and the Billboard 200.

Initial critical response to Ultra Beatdown was generally positive. At Metacritic, which assigns a normalised rating out of 100 to reviews from mainstream critics, the album has received an average score of 77, based on 8 reviews. Both AllMusic and Alternative Press gave it four and a half stars out of a possible five. AllMusic gave it an "AMG Album Pick" and, in the opening sentence of the review, likened the band to a juggernaut: "Look up the word "juggernaut" in the dictionary and you may just find Dragonforce's photo alongside the definition. Not only does it aptly describe the nature of their hyperkinetic "extreme power metal," but also their vertiginous ascent from utter music community obscurity to new media, errr...juggernaut, when their breakthrough single, "Through the Fire and Flames," became first a YouTube sensation and later a keystone of the Guitar Hero video game phenomenon".

Track listing
The ultra edition physical copy of the album contained a bonus DVD with the music videos for "Heroes of Our Time" and "The Last Journey Home", as well as videos The Making of Ultra Beatdown and The Making of the E-Gen Guitar.

Notes
On all non-standard physical editions of Ultra Beatdown, the length of The Warrior Inside is 7:44 as a 30-second gap of silence is added to the track.
"Strike of the Ninja" is a re-recording of a song titled "Feel the Fire", recorded by Totman and Theart under the name Shadow Warriors, and is shorter than all the other DragonForce songs in the Theart era.

Personnel

Charts

Release history

The album was set for release first in Japan on 20 August 2008 then on 22 August in Germany and the day after, on 23 August, in Australia before being released in the United Kingdom on 25 August and globally the following day.

References

DragonForce albums
2008 albums
Roadrunner Records albums
Spinefarm Records albums